Heavenly Twins is a  double summit mountain located in Ravalli County, Montana.

Description

Heavenly Twins is located in the Bitterroot Range, which is a subset of the Rocky Mountains. It is situated 11 miles west of Stevensville in the Selway–Bitterroot Wilderness, on land managed by Bitterroot National Forest. The summit lies 2.5 miles east of the Continental Divide and the Idaho–Montana border. The true summit is the south peak which is one-third mile from the 9,243-ft north peak, and the nearest higher neighbor is line parent Saint Mary Peak three miles to the east. Precipitation runoff from the mountain drains into tributaries of the Bitterroot River. This landform's toponym has been officially adopted by the United States Board on Geographic Names. The name refers to Castor and Pollux, also called the heavenly twins.

Climate

Based on the Köppen climate classification, Heavenly Twins is located in a subarctic climate zone characterized by long, usually very cold winters, and mild summers. Winter temperatures can drop below −10 °F with wind chill factors below −30 °F.

See also
 Geology of the Rocky Mountains

References

External links
 Weather forecast: Heavenly Twins

Bitterroot Range
Mountains of Montana
Mountains of Ravalli County, Montana
North American 2000 m summits
Bitterroot National Forest